Muddu Bidda is a 1987 Indian Telugu-language drama film directed by P. Chandrasekhara Reddy starring Krishna and Rajani in the lead roles. The film was jointly produced by P. Satyanarayana and Ch. Papa Rao for Balaji Films. The film was released on 4 December 1987.

Cast 
 Krishna Ghattamaneni
 Rajani
 Kaikala Satyanarayana
 Gummadi
 Kota Srinivasa Rao
 Sowcar Janaki
 Suttivelu
 Jayamalini

Soundtrack 

 "Anigindha Anigindha" -
 "Muddulanni" -
 "Chitti Potti Maattalo" -
 "Adbutha Vigraha" -
 "Goppinti Chinnadaniro" -
 "Amma Nannenduko" -

References

External links 

"32 years for Muddu Bidda" at Twitter
1987 films
Indian action drama films
Films scored by K. V. Mahadevan
1980s Telugu-language films
1980s action drama films
Films directed by P. Chandrasekhara Reddy